Rodolfo Galindo Zendejas (born January 7, 1996 in Naucalpan, Mexico) is a Mexican professional footballer who plays as a midfielder for Murciélagos of Ascenso MX on loan from Oaxaca.

External links
 
 

1996 births
Living people
People from Naucalpan
Mexican footballers
Association football midfielders
Liga MX players
Alebrijes de Oaxaca players
Irapuato F.C. footballers
Murciélagos FC footballers